Lognes–Émerainville aerodrome (French: aérodrome de Lognes–Émerainville) (ICAO : LFPL, IATA: XLG) is an aerodrome serving Lognes, in France. It is located 28 km east of Paris and 1.5km south of Lognes. It is located along A4 autoroute and Francilienne highway.

Traffic 
The airfield is open to light aviation under visual flight rules and to international traffic (upon request). In 2014, Lognes aerodrome handled 80,568 aircraft movements,and is today the second busiest airport in France in terms of movements (after Toussus le Noble airport). Traffic at Lognes mainly consists of general aviation (tourism, flight schools and helicopters).

Facilities 

The aerodrome is located at an elevation of 359 feet above mean sea level. It has one paved runway (26/08 paved) which measures 700 × 20 meters, and one unpaved runway (26/08 unpaved) which measures 1,100 × 100 meters.

The aerodrome hosts 10 flight clubs (aeroclubs):

 Henri Guillaumet aeroclub
 Plane Air aeroclub
 Aigle de Saint Maur aeroclub
 Les Aiglons aeroclub
 La Brie aeroclub
 Sadi Lecointe aeroclub 
 Paris Est aeroclub
 Lognes aeroclub
 Fly Academy flight school
 Aeroflight flight school

Transportation 

Lognes aerodrome is served by RATP bus 321 which goes to Lognes train station and by Seine-et-Marne express bus service to Meaux and Melun.

References

Airports in Île-de-France